In Sufism, a wāṣil ('one who reaches') is a murid or salik who accomplished and finished crossing the path of sulūk.

Presentation
The wāṣil is the sufi who has reached the spiritual stage where the divine Hijab is unveiled on his qalb.

When the Hijab is unveiled on the qalb of the salik and the tajalli manifests itself before him, one speaks that the sufi has reached the maqam of the wuṣūl.

Indeed, the good niyyah of the murid to follow the mystical path of suluk introduces him into the phase of salik which hangs him on a spiritual cord which connects his qalb to divine mercy.

Kinds
The wāṣil is presented in sufism according to several qualities which are:
Siddiq
Wali
Al-Insān al-Kāmil
Rabbani
Majzoob
Muqarrab

See also
Talibe
Murid
Salik

References

Arabic words and phrases
Sufism
Language and mysticism
Islamic belief and doctrine
Islamic terminology